In the biological sciences, a replicate is an exact copy of a sample that is being analyzed, such as a cell, organism or molecule, on which exactly the same procedure is done. This is often done in order to check for experimental or procedural error. In the absence of error replicates should yield the same result. However, replicates are not independent tests of the hypothesis because they are still the same sample, and so do not test for variation between samples.

Replicates are often created to test the quality and repeatability of a procedure, or for a destructive procedure where preserving the original sample is desirable. They are also sometimes inappropriately used to inflate the apparent number of observations in a sample, creating an illusion of statistical significance.

See also 
 Self-replication
 Fold change

References 

Biological processes
Measurement
Scientific method
Tests
Validity (statistics)